Lowell Bridge is a covered bridge in Lowell, Oregon, United States.  The original bridge was built in 1907. The current bridge was built in 1945.  It was listed on the National Register of Historic Places in 1979.

History 
Before the Lowell Bridge was constructed, pioneer Amos Hyland settled on the Middle Fork Willamette River in 1874, and established the town of Lowell, which he named after his birthplace of Lowell, Maine. The founding of the town coincided with construction of a railroad through the settlement. At the site of the current bridge, Hyland operated a ferry across the river. The ferry operated until 1907, when a bridge was built by Nels Roney, who was also the builder of the Shelton-McMurphey-Johnson House in Eugene.

An accident occurred in 1945 when a truck caused major damage to the bridge. It was replaced by the current bridge, which is the widest in the state. In 1953, in preparation for the flooding expected to be caused by the Dexter Dam in two years, the entire bridge was raised , and the floor replaced. Dexter Dam inundated the area, creating Dexter Reservoir, when it was completed in 1955.

After 1979 
On November 29, 1979, the bridge was added to the National Register of Historic Places. A concrete bypass of the bridge was under construction at the time, when a dump truck with its bed up drove through, causing major damage to the bridge. Unlike the prior damage, the bridge was repaired with new roof braces and portal boards before the bypass was opened a few weeks later.

The Western Federal Lands Highway Division, Lane County, the Oregon Department of Transportation, and the United States Forest Service built an interpretive center in 2006 for $1.2 million. It includes several signs explaining the history of Lane County's covered bridges, and the area around Lowell and Lowell Bridge.

See also 

 List of bridges on the National Register of Historic Places in Oregon
 List of Oregon covered bridges

References 

Covered bridges on the National Register of Historic Places in Oregon
Covered bridges in Lane County, Oregon
National Register of Historic Places in Lane County, Oregon
Bridges completed in 1945
1945 establishments in Oregon
Road bridges on the National Register of Historic Places in Oregon
Wooden bridges in Oregon
Howe truss bridges in the United States